Of the several caves of Aruba, three Aruban caves are well known, seen in deep crevices on the windward face of the island. All three of the caves are located in the Arikok National Park. The most prominent are Guadirikiri Cave, the Fontein Cave and the Huliba Cave. Nocturnal bats nestle in all these caves.

The importance which the Government of Aruba attaches to these three caves is borne by the fact that postage stamps with images of them were issued by Post Aruba in April 2009 in specific denominations. The stamp of 175 cents value depicts the Baranca Sunu Cave, the stamp of 200 cents denomination depicts the Fontein Cave, and the stamp of 225 cents value shows the entrance of Quadirikiri Grot (Guadirikiri Cave).

History
The history of the caves was initially linked to the Amerindians, a semi nomadic tribe who lived on the Aruba island about 4000 years ago. However, a small branch of Arawak Indians, known as Caquetio, inhabited this island around 1000 AD. The villages inhabited by them were near the towns of Santa Cruz and Savaneta, and the carvings inside the caves and rock faces testify to this inference. Historians have also inferred that Arubans also lived in caves but mainly for the purposes of performing sacrificial services and holding assemblies, and sometimes also to hide in the caves during enemy attacks.

Guadirikiri Cave

The Guadirikiri Cave (also known as "Quadiriki Caves") is notable for its two large dome-shaped chambers which are illuminated with sunlight through holes in the ceiling. Entry to the cave is at the base of the cliff. In order to preserve the natural habitat of the cave for the bats to breed, one of the caves is barred for visitors.

A somewhat dubious folk tale relates to a daughter of an Indian chief who fell in love and was imprisoned in the cave as her paramour was not acceptable to her father. Her beloved one was imprisoned nearby, in Huliba Cave (Tunnel of Love), but both lovers managed to meet underground. Both reportedly died in the cave and their spirit vanished into heaven through the holes in the roof of the cave.

Fontein Cave

The Fontein Cave is a small cave near Boca Prins on the northern part of the island. It is well known for its native Arawak drawings on the wall, which were decoratively etched by Amerindians on the stones walls and flatter roof portion of the cave in brownish-red colour or reddish brown or purplish colour; this in turn gives a clue to the history of the Amerindians. As it is in limestone geological formation, solution effect due to seeping water has resulted in colourful stalagmites and stalactites formations in very odd shapes and sizes. Long tongued bats nestle in the holes of the cave which go on their nocturnal hunt to collect and feed on food in the form of nectar and pollen. It is also reported that Arawak Indians used to perform their tribal rituals and ceremonies inside this cave.

Huliba Cave

The Huliba Cave (known as the "Baranca Sunu cave" also meaning "Naked Rock") is nicknamed the "Tunnel of Love" for its heart-shaped entrance. The entrance is through a steep and narrow stairway which dips into the cave. It has five entrances. At places, one has to crouch to see the formations. The cave is studded with stalagmites and stalactites formations in limestone rocks. Two bat species residing in this cave include the Southern Long-nosed Bat and long-tongued Fruit Bat. It is interesting to watch when the bats, after sleeping in the caves during the day time, fly out in hordes in search of food. The exit from the tunnel is through a series of steps that are carved on the rock face and are quite risky. In one of the chambers, the Virgin Mary has been carved in the natural rock formation. Legend mentions about pirates inhabiting the cave to hide their treasures, though there is no proof to confirm this.

Gallery

References

External links
https://web.archive.org/web/20080528142423/http://www.aruba.com/whattodo/caves.php

 
Caves of the Caribbean
Tourist attractions in Aruba